Wila Quta (Aymara wila blood, blood-red, quta lake, "red lake", also spelled Wila Khota, Wila Kkota) is a mountain in the Bolivian Andes which reaches a height of approximately . It is located in the La Paz Department, Loayza Province, Sapahaqui Municipality, at the border with the Luribay Municipality. Wila Quta lies northwest of Qutani.

References 

Mountains of La Paz Department (Bolivia)